is an international high school in Nishi-ku, Osaka, established by the Osaka YMCA in 1988.

References

External links

 Osaka YMCA International High School
  Osaka YMCA International High School

International schools in Osaka
1988 establishments in Japan
Educational institutions established in 1988
Universities and colleges founded by the YMCA